KPBN-LD, virtual and UHF digital channel 14, branded on-air as The Pelican, is a low-powered Sonlife-affiliated television station licensed to Baton Rouge, Louisiana, United States. The station is owned by Pelican Broadcasting. On cable, the station is seen on AT&T U-verse on Cox Communications and Allen Cable. It is also available online at pelicansportstv.com

KPBN's main programming feed is carried on the station's second digital subchannel, which is affiliated with the Pursuit Channel when local programs are not airing. The station's first subchannel airs Jimmy Swaggart's SonLife Broadcasting Network as that network's flagship station, while the fourth subchannel carries Light TV.

History

KPBN started as K07UJ, a translator station for the Woody Jenkins-owned WBTR. The station soon changed to channel 11 and was an independent station known as WTVK in 1994, owned by Gulf Atlantic Communications.  In 1995, WTVK served as Baton Rouge's first WB affiliate with a secondary affiliation with America One, yet the station failed to secure a spot on Baton Rouge's cable lineup and had a broadcast range of only six miles.  Only cable systems at LSU, Clinton, Jackson, and Watson carried the station.

By 1999, WBBR (now WBRL) signed on as a cable-only station, taking the WB affiliation, and channel 11 changed its call letters to KTTE, serving as an independent station on March 31 of that year that focused on local and sports programming.  At this time, KTTE secured a spot on TCI's cable lineup; however, the station struggled to stay on the air, as the owners faced eviction in August 2000.  After returning to the air for a brief period of time, the station signed off for good on December 27, 2000 after a conflict emerged between the station's owner, Dave Loflin of Gulf Atlantic, and station manager Upfront Partnership, owned by Tony Perkins and Bob Courtney.  On January 12, 2002, KPBN signed on channel 11, carrying a sports-centered programming lineup with some America One programming.  The station chose not to renew its America One affiliation once the network merged with YouToo TV.

Beginning in 2017, KPBN dropped its Untamed Sports TV affiliation and now only broadcast programming from The Pursuit Channel outside of local programming.  That same year, the station became Jimmy Swaggart's Sonlife TV network flagship station with sports programming moving to the second subchannel.  Pelican Sports was added to KPBN's second subchannel, and Light TV was added to the fourth subchannel on January 1, 2018.

KPBN-HD is now available on Cox Communications channel 1013, they are also working on their digital signal located on channel 14.

Programming

KPBN airs Louisiana-based programming and sports coverage, plus national programming and sports of interest to Louisiana residents. Daily programming includes This Week in Louisiana Agriculture and LSU Athletics.

Digital channels
The station's digital signal is multiplexed:

References

External links 
 Official Website

Television stations in Louisiana
Television channels and stations established in 1995